Torrents of Spring is a 1989 drama film written and directed by Jerzy Skolimowski and starring Timothy Hutton, Nastassja Kinski and Valeria Golino. It is based on the 1872 novel of the same name by Ivan Turgenev. It is a British, French, and Italian co-production. Set in 1840, the film follows a young Russian aristocrat, Dimitri Sanin, who is torn between the love of a beautiful German pastry-shop girl, Gemma Rosselli, and a Russian seductress, Princess Maria Nikolaevna. The film competed for the Golden Palm Award at the 1989 Cannes Film Festival.

Cast
 Timothy Hutton - Dimitri Sanin
 Nastassja Kinski - Maria Nikolaevna Polozov
 Valeria Golino - Gemma Rosselli
 William Forsythe - Prince Ippolito Polozov
 Urbano Barberini - Baron Von Doenhof
 Francesca De Sapio - Mrs. Rosselli
 Jacques Herlin - Pantaleone
 Antonio Cantafora - Richter
 Krzysztof Janczar - Klueber (as Christopher Janczar)
 Christian Dottorini - Emilio
 Alexia Korda - Mrs. Stoltz
 Marinella Anaclerio - Luisa
 Pietro Bontempo - Man with Glasses
 Thierry Langerak - La luna
 Xavier Maly - Pulcinella

Reception
The film grossed $111,747 upon its U.S. theatrical release.

References

External links
 
 
 
 

1989 drama films
1989 films
French drama films
Italian drama films
English-language French films
English-language Italian films
Films based on Russian novels
Films based on works by Ivan Turgenev
Films directed by Jerzy Skolimowski
Films scored by Stanley Myers
Films set in Germany
Films set in 1840
Films shot in Rome
Films shot in the Czech Republic
Films with screenplays by Jerzy Skolimowski
British drama films
1980s English-language films
1980s British films
1980s Italian films
1980s French films